The Set Decorators Society of America (SDSA) Awards are awards honoring the best set decorators in film and television. The inaugural SDSA Film Awards were held on March 31, 2021, and nominations were announced March 11, 2021. The first SDSA Television Awards took place on July 30, 2021, and the nominations were unveiled on June 16, 2021.

Categories

Film
 Best Achievement in Decor/Design of a Feature Film – Period
 Best Achievement in Decor/Design of a Feature Film – Science Fiction or Fantasy
 Best Achievement in Decor/Design of a Feature Film – Contemporary
 Best Achievement in Decor/Design of a Feature Film – Musical or Comedy

Television
 Best Achievement in Decor/Design of a One Hour Contemporary Series
 Best Achievement in Decor/Design of a One Hour Fantasy or Science Fiction Series
 Best Achievement in Decor/Design of a One Hour Period Series
 Best Achievement in Decor/Design of a Television Movie or Limited Series
 Best Achievement in Decor/Design of a Half-Hour Single-Camera Series
 Best Achievement in Decor/Design of a Half-Hour Multi-Camera Series
 Best Achievement in Decor/Design of a Short Format: Webseries, Music Video or Commercial
 Best Achievement in Decor/Design of a Variety, Reality or Competition Series
 Best Achievement in Decor/Design of a Variety Special
 Best Achievement in Decor/Design of a Daytime Series

Ceremonies
 2020
 2021
 2022

References

External links 
 

Entertainment industry societies
Film organizations in the United States
Guilds in the United States
Scenic design
Set decorators